The 2016 NCAA Division I Field Hockey Championship was the 36th annual women's collegiate field hockey tournament organized by the NCAA, to determine the national champion of Division I college field hockey in the United States. The semifinals and championship match were played at the L.R. Hill Sports Complex at Old Dominion University in Norfolk, Virginia from November 18 to 20, 2016.

Delaware defeated North Carolina in the final, 3–2, to win their first national title.

Qualified teams

 A total of 18 teams qualified for the 2016 tournament, the same number of teams as 2015. 10 teams received automatic bids by winning their conference tournaments and an additional 8 teams earned at-large bids based on their regular season records.

Automatic qualifiers

At-large qualifiers

Bracket

See also 
NCAA Division II Field Hockey Championship
NCAA Division III Field Hockey Championship

References 

2016
Field Hockey
2016 in women's field hockey
2016 in sports in Virginia